The Faial-Pico Channel is an  long channel that separates the islands of Faial and Pico in the central group of the archipelago of the Azores. The strait is divided into various depressions, calderas and micro-systems, referred to as Baixas.

Geography

Considered a minor reef, the Baixa do Norte has been used by some fishers, who extended their catches from the Baixa da Barca. The Baixa is characterized by peaks at the  depth, with large blocks of rock and a fishery of considerable dimension. In comparison, the southern margins is characterized by peaks to about  consisting of peaks and valleys.

The entire channel is distinguished by geological structures, including two sub-aquatic caldeiras, between  diameter.

Some of these cassums are broken by abrasive calderas, formed from large boulders grinding into the reef floor.

Biome
The regions gather a variety of organisms, that include small algae and crustaceans to large pelagic species, searching for these large concentration of fish. Due to the importance of these location, various studies by investigators at the regional Department of Oceanography and Fishing (DOP) and University of the Azores (UAç) have delineated these areas by the temporal differences between spring and summer seasons (based on 1997 research), noting a differentiation in marine life during the period, owing to a reduction of anthropological pressures.

The area was designated a ZEC, Zonas Especiais de Conservação (Special Conservation Zone) owing to the important habitats for common terns (Sterna hirundo), loggerhead sea turtle (Caretta caretta) and common bottlenose dolphin (Tursiops truncatus), as well as the Vidália (Azorina vidalii) and Spergularia azorica. The area is marked by two islets situated on the northwest coast of the island of Pico, in front of the seat of Madalena do Pico: the Madalena Islets, also known as the Ilhéu em Pé and Ilhéu Deitado. These islets are the remains of a volcanic cone that has devolved following a submarine and substratus eruption. It is an area of refuge and nesting for marine birds, and encircled by a regular ocean depth of sand and cliff at a maximum of  depth. At these depths there is a rich diversity of resident species, in addition to pelagic species, and spawning grounds of grey triggerfish.

References

Bodies of water of the Azores
Pico Island
Faial Island